SIGMA Clermont is a French graduate engineering school and is a public institution under the authority of the French Ministry of Higher Education, Research and Innovation. It is located in Aubière, Clermont-Ferrand metropolitan area, France.

It was created on 01.01.2016 following the merger of the French Institute for Advanced Mechanics (IFMA) and the National Graduate School of Chemistry (ENSCCF). SIGMA Clermont is a member of the French Conference of graduate engineering schools, and the Gay-Lussac Federation, which comprises 20 French chemistry schools. It is also an associated member of the Mines-Télécom network.

SIGMA Clermont offers two degrees in engineering, recognized by the national engineering commission: engineer in chemistry and engineer in advanced mechanics. These degrees are equivalent to a Master of Science.

Furthermore, SIGMA Clermont, situated in the Les Cézeaux science campus, is a member of Clermont University and Associates, the local higher education association.

Study offer 
SIGMA Clermont offers different specializations in its two main fields of studies, Chemistry and Mechanical Engineering:
 Chemistry and Chemical Engineering department
 Fine and Industrial Organic Chemistry (with further focus on therapeutical chemistry or natural substances and their applications)
 High Performance Materials 
 Chemical Engineering
 Mechanical Engineering Department
 Machines, Mechanics and Systems
 Materials and Structures
 Industrial Systems and Logistics 
Three additional study tracks allow all students further specializations: 
 International
 Aeronautics 
 Entrepreneurship    
Around a quarter of the curriculum is dedicated to human and social skills, economics and languages (French as Foreign Language, English, German, Spanish, Portuguese, Italian and Chinese).

Research 
SIGMA Clermont faculty members conduct their research activities within the framework of three high-level laboratories (Institut Pascal, LIMOS and ICCF), in collaboration with the CNRS and Clermont-Auvergne University, and cover a broad range of chemical and mechanical themes. Main axes of research are:
 Antalgic molecules
 Mechanics of materials and structures
 Photochemistry
 Image, perception systems, robotics
 (Bio)organic Chemistry
 Industrial Systems
 Process engineering, energy, bio systems
 Biophysical chemistry for the atmosphere
 Photonics, wave technology, nanomaterials
 Fluorescent materials
 Nanocomposites

References

Engineering universities and colleges in France
Universities and colleges in Clermont-Ferrand
Educational institutions established in 2016
2016 establishments in France